The Sydney Cup is an Australian Turf Club Group 1 Thoroughbred handicap horse race, for horses three years old and older, run over 3200 metres at Randwick Racecourse in Sydney, Australia in the autumn during the ATC Championships series and it is the longest race in the club. Total prize money is A$2,000,000.

The origins of this race are associated with colonial Sydney and the growth of thoroughbred racing in the colony during the 1850s. The Australian Jockey Club initiated an Autumn race meet of initially two days and expanded it as horse racing became the most attended sport meeting.

Name
The inaugural running of the race was 1 May 1862 as part of the Metropolitan Autumn Meeting at Randwick. The race was known as Jockey Club Handicap and it was the third race on the card. The race attracted 9 runners over the famed 2 miles and was won by the odds on favourite Talleyrand in a time of 3 minutes 52 seconds.

In 1863 the Randwick Autumn Meeting, the third race on the first day of the meet was the Randwick Grand Handicap. The race was run by five entrants with the winner Traveller in a time of 3 minutes 42 seconds.

By 1865 the race was called the Randwick Grand Handicap Sweepstakes. With influx of money that was being offered by the Victoria Racing Club in Melbourne for the Melbourne Cup the AJC decided to change the name of the race in 1866 to the Sydney Gold Cup and move its scheduling to the second day of the meet. The 1866 Sydney Cup was presented to jockey Samuel Holmes and the immensely popular colonial horse, Yattendon, who demonstrated prowess by winning 11 out of his 17 starts. The gold cup was presented for the first time in this race and was made of 18 carat gold.

Of the more famous horses to win the race was dual winner of the race The Barb (1868–69) and also winner of the Melbourne Cup and from the same era Carbine who also won the race twice (1889–90).

In the 20th century the race held its prominence and although it never overtook the Melbourne Cup the race complemented the Australian Racing Calendar by being held in the autumn.

Other dual winners include: Mosaic (1939–40), Veiled Threat (1942, 1944), Tie The Knot (1998–99).

In 1973 the race was set at a distance of 3,200 metres due to the metric conversion in Australia.

Kingston Town was the first to win the Sydney Cup as a Group 1 race in 1980. The distinction for the fastest recorded time is 3 minutes and 19 seconds, set by 'Apollo Eleven' in 1973 and equalled by Just A Dancer in 1991.

History

1941 Racebook

1942 & 1952 Racebooks

Winners

2022 - Knights Order
2021 - Selino
2020 - Etah James
2019 - Shraaoh
2018 - Who Shot Thebarman
†2017 - Polarisation
2016 - Gallante
 2015 - Grand Marshal
 2014 - The Offer
 2013 - Mourayan
 2012 - Niwot
 2011 - Stand To Gain
 2010 - Jessicabeel
 2009 - Ista Kareem
 2008 - No Wine No Song
 2007 - Gallic
 2006 - County Tyrone
 2005 - Mahtoum
 2004 - Makybe Diva
 2003 - Honor Babe
 2002 - Henderson Bay
 2001 - Mr. Prudent
 2000 - Streak
 1999 - Tie The Knot
 1998 - Tie The Knot
 1997 - Linesman
 1996 - Count Chivas
 1995 - Daacha
 1994 - Cross Swords
 1993 - Azzaam
 1992 - My Eagle Eye
 1991 - Just A Dancer
 1990 - King Aussie
 1989 - Palace Revolt
 1988 - Banderol
 1987 - Major Drive
 1986 - Marooned
 1985 - Late Show
 1984 - Trissaro
 1983 - Veloso
 1982 - Azawary
 1981 - Our Paddy Boy
 1980 - Kingston Town
 1979 - Double Century
 1978 - My Good Man
 1977 - Reckless
 1976 - Oopik
 1975 - Gay Master
 1974 - Battle Heights
 1973 - Apollo Eleven
 1972 - Dark Suit
 1971 - Gallic Temple
 1970 - Arctic Symbol
 1969 - Lowland
 1968 - General Command
 1967 - Galilee
 1966 - Prince Grant
 1965 - River Seine
 1964 - Zinga Lee
 1963 - Maidenhead
 1962 - Grand Print
 1961 - Sharply
 1960 - Grand Garry
 1959 - On Line  
 1958 - Straight Draw
 1957 - Electro
 1956 - Sailor's Guide
 1955 - Talisman
 1954 - Gold Scheme
 1953 - Carioca
 1952 - Opulent
 1951 - Bankstream
 1950 - Sir Falcon
 1949 - Carbon Copy
 1948 - Dark Marne
 1947 - Proctor
 1946 - Cordale
 1945 - Craigie
 1944 - Veiled Threat
 1943 - Abspear
 1942 - Veiled Threat
 1941 - Lucrative
 1940 - Mosaic
 1939 - Mosaic
 1938 - L'Aiglon
 1937 - Mestoravon
 1936 - Contact
 1935 - Akuna
 1934 - Broad Arrow
 1933 - Rogilla
 1932 - Johnnie Jason
 1931 - The Dimmer
 1930 - Gwillian G.
 1929 - Crucis
 1928 - Winalot
 1927 - Piastoon
 1926 - Murray King
 1925 - Lilypond
 1924 - Scarlet
 1923 - David
 1922 - Prince Charles
 1921 - Eurythmic
 1920 - Kennaquhair
 1919 - Ian 'Or
 1918 - Rebus
 1917 - The Fortune Hunter
 1916 - Prince Bardolph
 1915 - Scotch Artillery
 1914 - Lilyveil
 1913 - Cadonia
 1912 - Saxonite
 1911 - Moorilla
 1910 - Vavasor  
 1909 - Trafalgar
 1908 - Dyed Garments
 1907 - Realm
 1906 - Noreen
 1905 - Tartan
 1904 - Lord Cardigan
 1903 - Street Arab
 1902 - Wakeful
 1901 - San Fran
 1900 - La Carabine
 1899 - Diffidence
 1898 - Merloolas
 1897 - Tricolor
 1896 - Wallace
 1895 - Patroness
 1894 - Lady Trenton
 1893 - Realm
 1892 - Stromboli
 1891 - Highborn
 1890 - Carbine
 1889 - Carbine
 1888 - The Australian Peer
 1887 - Frisco
 1886 - Cerise And Blue
 1885 - Normanby
 1884 - Favo
 1883 - Darebin
 1882 - Cunnamulla
 1881 - Progress
 1880 - Petrea
 1879 - Savanaka
 1878 - Democrat
 1877 - Kingfisher
 1876 - A.T.
 1875 - Imperial
 1874 - Speculation
 1873 - Vixen
 1872 - The Prophet
 1871 - Mermaid
 1870 - Barbelle
 1869 - The Barb
 1868 - The Barb 
 1867 - Fishhook 
 1866 - Yattendon
 1865 - Union Jack
 1864 - Tarragon
 1863 - Traveller
 1862 - Talleyrand

Notes:

† The event was originally scheduled on 8 April 2017, but was abandoned when Almoonqith broke down shortly after the start of the race. The race was rescheduled and run two weeks later on 22 April 2017.

See also
 List of Australian Group races
 Group races

References

Open long distance horse races
Group 1 stakes races in Australia
Randwick Racecourse
 
1862 establishments in Australia
Sports competitions in Sydney